Ashirbadi Lal Srivastava, more commonly known as A.L. Srivastava, born 16 September 1899, in Andhana, Uttar Pradesh, died 12 July 1973, in Agra district, was an Indian historian specialising in medieval, early modern and modern history of India.

Life and work 
Srivastava studied history in Lucknow where he made his Ph.D. (Doctor of philosophy) in 1932, and in Agra and Lucknow where he achieved D. litt. (Doctor of Letters, 1938/1945) with works concerning the three first Nawabs of Oudh (Awadh) in the 18th century (see article Nawabs of Oudh). Besides English and his mother tongue Hindi, he mastered Persian, the language at court and of diplomats, and Urdu as well and owned a working knowledge of Sanskrit, Marathi, Rajasthani and Punjabi. For Arabic sources he asked the advice of Muslim Maulwis.

In 1917, he was married to Phool Kumari (1904-1973); the couple had three sons and three daughters.

1927 he passed M.A. and got a job at Government College, Udaipur. 1932 he was awarded Ph.D. from University of Lucknow (first Ph.D. degree holder in the history of this faculty).  In 1934 he became head of Dungar College, Bikaner, in 1938 he was promoted to D. Litt. by the University of Agra.

In 1943, Srivastava was appointed head of the history department at D.A.V. College, Lahore. In 1946, he was given additional charge of the professor and head of history department, Panjab University, Lahore. In August, 1947, he was appointed professor and head, history and political science department, Agra College, Agra and retired from this Institution on 30 June 1962.

Srivastava published in English as well as in Hindi. As his Guru in history he named Prof. K. R. Qanungo, while recognizing the Bengali historian Jadunath Sarkar (1870-1959) as "greatest authority on the history of India".

He died, aged 74, from stomach cancer.

Srivastava is a recipient of Sir Jadunath Sarkar Gold Medal of the Asiatic Society, Calcutta (1953) for his research work on medieval Indian history. He was a contributor to the Encyclopædia Britannica and to the Bengali and the Marathi Encyclopaedias of Calcutta and Poona (see list above) and founder resp. chief editor of two research journals, Agra College Journal of History and Uttara Bharati Journal of Research. As academic teacher he supervised about 30 students for their Ph.D. and D.Litt. degrees.

Partial list of works
The First Two Nawabs of Awadh, Saadat Khan (1680-1739) and Safdar Jung (1708-1754)
Shuja-ud-Daulah - Vol. I (1754-1765)
Shuja-ud-Daulah - Vol. II (1765-1775)
Sher Shah Suri and His Successors (1539-1545 AD)
The Mughal Empire, 1526-1803 A.D by A. L Srivastava( Book )
Akbar the Great : [in three volumes] by A. L Srivastava( Book )
A Short History of Akbar the Great (1542-1605 AD)
Studies in Indian History (Collection of Research Papers)
History and Culture of Agra (Souvenir), 1956
History of the Indian Subcontinent, in Encyclopaedia Britannica, 15th edition, 1974, pages 334-430. Publisher-Encyclopaedia Britannica Inc., Helen Hemingway Benton, U.S.A.
Life in Sanchi sculpture by A. L Srivastava( Book )
Nandyāvarta, an auspicious symbol in Indian art by A. L Srivastava( Book )
Śilpa-śrī, studies in Indian art and culture by A. L Srivastava( Book )
Umā-Maheśvara : an iconographic study of the divine couple by A. L Srivastava( Book )
On Siva and Uma (Hindu deities)
Bhāratīya kalā-pratīka by A. L Srivastava( Book )
Origin and development of symbols in Indic art; a study
Pro. Kr̥shṇadatta Bājapeyī : smr̥ti viśeshāṅka( Book )
Commemoration volume on the life and work of K.D. Bajpai, 1918-1992, Indologist, and on the civilization of India
Śilpa-sahasradala : directory of unique, rare, and uncommon Brahmanical sculptures by N. P Joshi( Book )
Indian art icons : revealing some glaring glimpses by A. L Srivastava( Book )
Bhāratīya saṃskr̥ti aura śilpa by A. L Srivastava( Book )
Study of depiction and influence of Hindu culture and mythology in Indian sculpture
Indian iconography : musing in some unique and unusual sculptures by A. L Srivastava( Book )
Svāstika : Bhāratīya jīvana kā eka apratima pratīka by A. L Srivastava( Book )
Swastikas as depicted in Indic art and culture; a study
Savatsa gau, athavā, Savatsa dhenu by A. L Srivastava( Book )
Śrī Hajārīmala Bān̐ṭhiyā abhinandana-grantha( Book )
Commemorative volume published on the occasion of the 71st birth anniversary of Hajārīmala Bān̐ṭhiyā, b. 1924, social worker and educationist from Rajasthan; reminiscences by his friends and associates on his life and work; includes articles by Bān̐thiyā
The Aligarh movement; its origin and development, 1858-1906 by Ema. Esa Jaina( Book )
Study on the movement of Indian Muslim regeneration established at Aligarh, India
Pañcāla kā mūrti-śilpa : eka śodhaparaka vivecana by A. L Srivastava( Book )
Administration of justce [sic] in seventeenth century India; a study of salient concepts of Mughal justice by B. S Jain( Book )
Major contributions to Volume 7: The Mughul Empire [1526-1707] in The History and Culture of the Indian People
Medieval Indian culture 
The history of India, 1000 A.D.-1707 A.D
The Sultanate of Delhi, including the Arab invasion of Sindh, 711-1526 A.D 
Bhāratavarsha kā rājanaitika tathā sāṃskr̥tika itihāsa.
 Modern India, Part I (I49S-1S58), 1969.

Books in Hindi
  Awadh Ke Pratham Do Nawab
  Shuja-ud-daulah, Vol. I (in press)
  Dilli Sultanat
  Mughal Kalin Bharat
  Madhya Kalin Bhartiya Sanskriti
  Bharat Ka Itihas
  Akbar Mahan, Vol. I
  Akbar Mahan, Vol. If

References

External links
 Srivastava Historian

Lal Srivastava, Ashirbadi
People from Agra
Academic staff of the University of the Punjab